The State Register of Heritage Places is maintained by the Heritage Council of Western Australia. , 430 places are heritage-listed in the Town of Cottesloe, of which 27 are on the State Register of Heritage Places.

List
The Western Australian State Register of Heritage Places, lists the following 27 state registered places within the Town of Cottesloe:

References

Cottesloe